Meaghan Benfeito (born March 2, 1989) is a Canadian diver. She used to compete in the 10m synchronized event with Roseline Filion before the latter retired in January 2017. Benfeito and Filion won bronze medals in the 10 m platform synchro event at the 2012 and 2016 Summer Olympics, and in the latter event Benfeito also won a bronze medal in the 10 m platform individual event.

Early life
Benfeito was born on March 2, 1989, in Montreal, Quebec to Portuguese parents, Arthur Benfeito and Margarida Correia. She has younger twin sisters, Alicia and Chelsea.

Career
She began diving for Canada in 2005 and credits Emilie Heymans and Alexandre Despatie for inspiring her to take up the sport. She won a bronze medal at the 2005 World Aquatics Championships in her hometown of Montreal, but she and Filion have been unable to return to the medal podium at the Worlds since.  In 2006, they won a bronze at the Commonwealth Games. Benfeito won a bronze medal at the 2007 Pan American Games in the 3m Synchronized event with Kelly MacDonald.

Benfeito and Filion qualified for the Beijing Olympics after they beat teammates Heymans and Marie-Eve Marleau which was considered a dramatic upset, particularly at defeating Canadian diving legend Heymans. At the 2008 Summer Olympics, the diving partners finished in 7th place. She did not compete in the 2010 Commonwealth Games due to a lingering shoulder injury that had not healed in time.

Both the ladies failed to medal at any events leading into the 2012 Summer Olympics in London. At the 2012 edition the two Canadians managed to hold third place through nearly the whole competition in the 10 m platform synchro event. After the medal clinching dive she said that "We gave it all we had and we came away with a bronze medal. We're pretty happy with that." A Quebec politician from a provincially sovereigntist party, the Parti Québécois, commented on the medals won by Benfeito and others as the first four medals won were from Quebec athletes. Pauline Marois said that ""This means, among other things, that it’s another example of how Quebec could shine among the brightest ... as an independent country. We could continue to win our medals, I’m sure of that." Benfeito responded to a similar question from Canadian media when asked if she was as proud of the day as all the day's medalists were from Quebec athletes by saying that "No, we are one big happy gang. We are equally as proud of our home in Quebec as we are of our home in Canada."

At the 2014 Commonwealth Games, she won a gold medal in the 10 m platform synchronised with Fillion, and gold in the 10 m platform individual.

At the 2016 Summer Olympics in Rio de Janeiro, Benfeito and Filion repeated their bronze medal performance in the 10 m platform synchro event, while Benfeito won an additional individual medal in the individual platform diving event. Fillion placed sixth in the latter event.

Benfeito was named as Canada's flag bearer for the 2018 Commonwealth Games in the Gold Coast, Australia.

She has qualified to represent Canada at the 2020 Summer Olympics. After successfully completing the preliminaries of the 10 metre tower, she finished 13th in the semi-finals and did not advance to the final. She announced her last Olympics were Tokyo and plans to retired from diving.

In April 2022, she announced her retirement from diving.

Personal life
Benfeito and Filion have been together as diving partners for a long time and reportedly consider each other as lifelong friends. Filion said of their relationship that, "We've known one another for our entire lives, so we have a really good relationship. It's more of a sisterhood relationship now. We could probably go to a restaurant and order for each other."

References

External links

Meaghan Benfeito at Diving Plongeon Canada

1989 births
Divers from Montreal
Francophone Quebec people
Canadian people of Portuguese descent
Living people
Olympic divers of Canada
Divers at the 2006 Commonwealth Games
Divers at the 2007 Pan American Games
Divers at the 2008 Summer Olympics
Divers at the 2011 Pan American Games
Divers at the 2012 Summer Olympics
Divers at the 2016 Summer Olympics
Divers at the 2018 Commonwealth Games
Canadian female divers
Olympic bronze medalists for Canada
Olympic medalists in diving
Medalists at the 2012 Summer Olympics
Medalists at the 2016 Summer Olympics
Commonwealth Games gold medallists for Canada
Divers at the 2014 Commonwealth Games
Divers at the 2015 Pan American Games
World Aquatics Championships medalists in diving
Commonwealth Games bronze medallists for Canada
Pan American Games gold medalists for Canada
Pan American Games silver medalists for Canada
Pan American Games bronze medalists for Canada
Commonwealth Games medallists in diving
Pan American Games medalists in diving
Divers at the 2019 Pan American Games
Medalists at the 2011 Pan American Games
Medalists at the 2015 Pan American Games
Medalists at the 2019 Pan American Games
Divers at the 2020 Summer Olympics
Medallists at the 2006 Commonwealth Games
Medallists at the 2014 Commonwealth Games
Medallists at the 2018 Commonwealth Games